Portland Rugby Football Club may refer to:
Portland Rugby Football Club (Maine)
Portland Rugby Football Club (Oregon)